The 1900 Illinois Fighting Illini football team was an American football team that represented the University of Illinois during the 1900 Western Conference football season.  In their first season under head coach Fred Smith, the Illini compiled a 7–3–2 record and finished in eighth place in the Western Conference. End/halfback Arthur R. Hall was the team captain.

Schedule

Roster

References

Illinois
Illinois Fighting Illini football seasons
Illinois Fighting Illini football